California Institution for Women (CIW) is a women's state prison located in the city of Chino, San Bernardino County, California, east of Los Angeles, although the mailing address states "Corona," which is in Riverside County, California.

Facilities
Although the official California Department of Corrections and Rehabilitation documents give a "Corona, California" mailing address for CIW in Riverside County, the prison has been physically located in the city of Chino since 2003 following an annexation of land in previously-unincorporated San Bernardino County.

CIW has . Its facilities include Level I ("Open dormitories without a secure perimeter") housing, Level II ("Open dormitories with secure perimeter fences and armed coverage") housing, and Level III ("Individual cells, fenced perimeters and armed coverage") housing. In addition, a Reception Center "provides short term housing to process, classify and evaluate incoming inmates."

As of Fiscal Year 2008/2009, CIW had 977 staff and an annual budget of $75 million Institutional and $2.6 million Education.  As of October 31, 2013, it had a design capacity of 1,398 but a total institution population of 2,155, for an occupancy rate of 154.1 percent.

As of April 30, 2020, CIW was incarcerating people at 111.1% of its design capacity, with 2,640 occupants.

CIW is located east of Downtown Los Angeles, and it takes about one hour to travel to the prison from Downtown LA.

History
The original California Institution for Women was dedicated in Tehachapi in 1932; however, after the 1952 Kern County earthquake, the female inmates were transferred to the just-opened CIW in Chino, and the Tehachapi facility was rebuilt as the male-only California Correctional Institution. CIW was originally called "California Institution for Women at Corona," but "Corona residents objected to the use of their city in the prison's name and it was changed March 1, 1962, to Frontera, a feminine derivative of the word frontier, symbolic for a new beginning." It housed the location of the death row for women in the state. CIW was the only women's prison in California until 1987, when the Northern California Women's Facility opened.

In the early years of CIW, convicted women wore Sunday dresses while walking and working at the campus-like setting until the 1980s when three towers were added with officers atop armed with shotguns.  Among other programs for inmates at CIW is "Voices from Within" in which inmates read books on tapes for "high school students in remedial classes," "college students with reading disabilities," and the blind.

In 2007, the state of California proposed building 45 new units for mentally ill inmates at CIW and 975 at the nearby California Institution for Men; local officials opposed such plans.

From 2006 to 2013 one woman at CIW committed suicide. From January 1, 2013 to July 2016 six women committed suicide at CIW, and there had been an increase in suicide attempts.

Notable inmates
 Renee Alway, a former inmate, is a noted American model and a former contestant of America's Next Top Model and Modelville runner-up. She was sentenced to a 12-year sentence for four felony burglary counts and one count each of vehicular theft and being a felon in possession of a firearm, and was released in 2018 after serving 5 years. She was arrested again in 2019 for domestic violence.
 Betty Broderick, a current inmate, was a San Diego socialite who was convicted of the 1989 murder of her ex-husband, Dan Broderick, and his new wife, Linda Kolkena Broderick. She was convicted in 1991 and was sentenced to 32-years-to-life in prison. She has failed her first three opportunities for parole, in 2010, 2011, and 2017, respectively, due to a “lack of remorse”, “refusal to apologize” and “denial of any wrongdoing.” She will not be eligible for a parole hearing again until 2032.
 Julia Rodriquez Diaz (First female inmate to receive 15 years parole denial under Proposition 9 (Marsy's Law) Convicted in July 1979 of the murder of seven-year-old boy Javier Angel. Story told in September 2013 on Investigation Discovery's Deadly Women "Heartless Souls" (Was recently moved to California Institution for Women (CIW) in 2014.)
 Barbara Graham, murderer, and subject of the 1958 film I Want to Live!.  Graham was subsequently executed at San Quentin State Prison on June 3, 1955.
 Claudia Haro, ex-wife of actor Joe Pesci. Pleaded no contest to attempted murder for hiring a hitman to kill her now ex-husband and Hollywood stunt-man, Garrett Warren. She served 7 years out of 12-year sentence from 2012-2019.
 Theresa Knorr (née Cross) - Was charged and found guilty of two counts of murder, two counts of conspiracy to commit murder, and two special circumstances charges: multiple murder and murder by torture. Was sentenced to two consecutive life sentences.
 Patricia Krenwinkel and Leslie Van Houten, of Charles Manson's "Family", are current inmates. Susan Atkins, another Manson Family member, was transferred to Central California Women's Facility in May 2008. Susan Atkins died September 24, 2009.
 Stephanie Lazarus, a former LAPD detective convicted in 2012 of the 1986 murder of a former boyfriend's wife, is currently in CIW.
 Dorothea Puente, a convicted serial killer, "did two years and six months [at CIW] for a forgery conviction" beginning in 1984.
 Cathy Evelyn Smith was in CIW between December 1986 and March 1988 for involuntary manslaughter and drug charges related to the death of John Belushi.
 Brenda Ann Spencer, a current inmate, was convicted of killing two people and wounding nine at a school in San Diego in 1979.
 Lucille Miller, served 7 years, from 1965 until being paroled in 1972, of a life sentence for the first-degree murder of her husband in what prosecutors alleged was a real-life case of Double Indemnity. Miller's case was the subject of an essay by Joan Didion in the writer's 1968 book Slouching Towards Bethlehem.

See also
 California Institution for Men

References

External links
 
 University of California, Los Angeles Libraries images:
 California Institution for Women, cottages, Tehachapi, 1933
 California Institution for Women, cottage interior, Tehachapi, 1933 

1952 establishments in California
Women's prisons in California
Buildings and structures in San Bernardino County, California
Chino, California
Capital punishment in California